UniCredit banka may refer to:

 UniCredit Bank Serbia, a Serbian subsidiary of Italian banking group UniCredit, sometimes known as UniCredit banka
 UniCredit Bank Slovenia, a subsidiary of Italy-based UniCredit Group

See also
 UniCredit Banca, a defunct retail banking division of UniCredit Group